Revolutsionnyi vostok (Russian: Революционный восток; Revolutionary East) was a monthly theoretical journal which was published by the Communist University of the Toilers of the East (KUTV) between 1927 and 1938 in Moscow. It was one of the major Orientalist publications in the Soviet Union.

History and profile
Revolutsionnyi vostok was launched by the KUTV in 1927. It came out monthly and was headquartered in Moscow. In the second issue the journal featured the Russian translation of the first chapter of the Mao Zedong's Hunan report which described the details of the Chinese peasant movement. In 1929 the journal published articles in which Nikolai Nasonov and Endre Sík discussed the distinct understandings of race based on Marxism. The journal folded in 1938.

References

1927 establishments in the Soviet Union
1938 disestablishments in the Soviet Union
Monthly magazines published in Russia
Communist magazines
Defunct political magazines
Former state media
Magazines published in the Soviet Union
Magazines established in 1927
Magazines disestablished in 1938
Russian-language magazines
Magazines published in Moscow
Political magazines published in Russia